The United States Virgin Islands general election was held on November 2, 2010. Voters chose the Governor of the United States Virgin Islands, the non-voting delegate to the U.S. House of Representatives and all fifteen seats in the Legislature of the Virgin Islands.  The election coincided with the 2010 United States general election.

Governor

Incumbent Democratic Governor John de Jongh and Lt. Governor Gregory Francis was re-elected for a second term in office, and defeated independent gubernatorial candidate and former Lt. Governor Kenneth Mapp and his running mate, Malik Sekou, with almost 57% of the vote.

U.S. House of Representatives

Incumbent U.S. Virgin Islands Delegate Donna Christian-Christensen, a Democrat, sought re-election. She faced Republican Vincent Emile Danet and independent candidates Guillaume Mimoun and Jeffrey Baxter Christian. Christian-Christansen won the general election with 71.22% of the vote.

Legislature of the Virgin Islands 
All fifteen seats in the Legislature of the Virgin Islands were up for election.

Board of Elections 
Members of the Board of Elections were elected.

References

2010 United States Virgin Islands elections
Elections in the United States Virgin Islands